Daniel Lee (born 5 January 1940) is a British former boxer. He competed in the men's flyweight event at the 1960 Summer Olympics. He fought as Danny Lee. At the 1960 Summer Olympics, he defeated Salek Mahju of Indonesia, before losing to Manfred Homberg of the United Team of Germany.

Lee won the 1960 Amateur Boxing Association British flyweight title, when boxing out of the Woodhall ABC.

References

External links
 

1940 births
Living people
Scottish male boxers
British male boxers
Olympic boxers of Great Britain
Boxers at the 1960 Summer Olympics
People from Port Glasgow
Sportspeople from Inverclyde
Flyweight boxers